Huang Qing Yuan (黃清元) is a famous Singaporean singer who started singing in the 1960s. He was also known as the 'Elvis of Singapore'.  

The song he is most well known for is Man Li (蔓莉). He started singing at age 7 when he joined a children's singing competition which he won and received two cans of soda as the prize. He then recorded over 100 EPs and LPs which are still available in Singapore, Malaysia, Indonesia, and more.  

At the 2015 Getai Awards, he received a contribution award in honour of his 40 years of getai performance.

References

Singaporean musicians